Padang Aro is a town or Sub-district in South Solok Regency, of West Sumatra province of Indonesia and it is the seat (capital) of South Solok Regency.

Populated places in West Sumatra
Regency seats of West Sumatra